The Metro Manila Popular Music Festival (also known as Metropop) was launched by the Popular Music Foundation of the Philippines in 1977 and held annually from 1978 to 1985. It was "the country’s pioneering and once foremost songwriting competition," according to The Philippine Star. Its objective was to promote the advancement of Filipino music, and its chief proponents were journalist Teodoro Valencia and Imee Marcos. These festivals launched many the careers of songwriters and singers (who interpreted the songs), and gave original Filipino music more than a few memorable and modern-day song classics. Among them is Freddie Aguilar.

This songwriting competition was originally open to all music composers. From the fourth festival onwards, the competition was divided into professional and amateur divisions, to give new songwriters a level playing field without competing with more well-known composers. After 1985, the festival was discontinued due to a decline in public interest towards the song entries.

It was later revived as the Metropop Song Festival which aired on GMA Network from 1996 to 2003.

The original Metropop (1978–1985)

The 1st Metro Manila Popular Music Festival

"Anak" failed to win any of the prizes, but went on to become one of the most popular Philippine pop songs ever and to launch the career of Freddie Aguilar. This period in time was right at the beginning of the Original Pilipino Music (OPM) boom, and after this first festival, the singing careers of Hajji Alejandro, Celeste Legaspi, Maricris Bermont, and Anthony Castelo went to full gear. Ryan Cayabyab is now a well-respected composer and musician; so as Joel Navarro. Imelda Papin and Janet Basco went on to big careers as well after they had other hit songs. Heber Bartolome's "Tayo'y Mga Pinoy" became a protest anthem, and Ryan Cayabyab's "Kay Ganda ng Ating Musika" became the anthem of sorts of Original Pilipino Music. Emil Mijares was the musical director for this festival. The first grand finals of the festival was held at the Folk Arts Theater, with RPN-9 as the official broadcaster for the first edition of the said competition.

The 2nd Metro Manila Popular Music Festival

This time, Freddie Aguilar's interpretation of Snaffu Rigor's composition won the grand prize. However, the biggest pop hit to come out of the 2nd Metropop was that of "Ewan". This song launched the career of Louie Ocampo, now a well-respected composer, and added to the numerous hits of The Apo Hiking Society. The Apo is one of the biggest musical acts ever in the Philippines, and their songs have been covered through the years. Rico J. Puno, already a big star at this time, interpreted the third place song, which also became a hit song for him. Composer George Canseco failed to win any of the top prizes, but with his songs before and after the competition, he became one of the most prolific and successful composers in the music scene. "Umagang Kay Ganda" also failed to place, but has since become a classic pop hit, and was used as the theme song of ABS-CBN's now-defunct weekday morning show of the same title, and most recently, as the campaign song for the presidential bid of Bongbong Marcos.

The 3rd Metro Manila Popular Music Festival

Leah Navarro and "Isang Mundo Isang Awit" represented the Philippines and won the bronze prize at that year's Seoul Popular Music Festival.  "Ikaw, Ako, Tayo (Magkakapatid)" turned out to be the biggest hit from the Third Metropop.

The 4th Metro Manila Popular Music Festival

Established singers like Florante, Eugene Villaluz, Leo Valdez, and Marco Sison interpreted their first Metropop entries. Something Special was an offshoot of The New Minstrels, and Joseph Olfindo also came from the latter singing group. There was no big hit from the festival songs, although "Kahit Konti" and "Magsimula Ka" were relative successes. Emil Sanglay (pioneer of the Neo-Ethnic Rock or the world music of today in the Philippines) and Sonny Nicolas also known as Philippine's "Jose Feliciano" (both singers, composers and guitarists) were the only individuals who interpreted their own songs. The one aside from the women in Something Special (there were male members as well), all the interpreters in this festival were men.

The 5th Metro Manila Popular Music Festival

The 6th Metro Manila Popular Music Festival

The 7th Metro Manila Popular Music Festival

The 8th Metro Manila Popular Music Festival

Metropop Song Festival (1996–2003)
The Metropop Song Festival (also known as Metropop) was an annual Philippine music festival that served as a relaunch of the original competition, which began in 1996 and ran until 2003.  The festival was broadcast on GMA Network. It has recognized non-mainstream musicians such as Gary Granada and Angelo Villegas, and boosted the singing careers of Jaya and Carol Banawa upon participating as interpreters.

Another associated event called the Metropop Young Singers (later renamed Metropop Star Search) ran at the same time. Unlike the main festival, this event served as a talent competition for young aspiring singers. The contestants were judged based on their interpretation or cover of an already released music material. The most notable participant was Melanie Calumpad who came third in 1997 and later returned as an interpreter for the actual song festival in 2003 under her stage name Kyla. She went on to have a successful career in music and competed as an interpreter for the winning songs at the Himig Handog and Philippine Popular Music Festival song contests.

Metropop Song Festival winners

1996:
Sometimes You Just Know, composers: Danny Tan, and Edith Gallardo, interpreter: Jaya (grand prize)
Shine, composer: Trina Belamide, interpreter: Ima Castro (recording only) (second prize)
Aawitin Ko, Ang Awit Mo, composer: Greg Caro, interpreter: Rannie Raymundo (third prize)

1997:
Para Sa Inyo, 'Tong Kanta Kong 'To, composer and interpreter: Gideon "Jungee" Marcelo (grand prize)
If I Could, composer: Dodjie Simon, interpreter: Lloyd Umali (second prize)
Delikado, Delikadesa, composer: Soc Villanueva, interpreter: Judith Banal (third prize)

1998:
Mabuti Pa Sila, composer and interpreter: Gary Granada (grand prize)
Bring Back The Times, composer: Eunice Saldaña, interpreter: Dessa (second prize)
You Make Me Smile, composer: Rica Arambulo, interpreter: Carol Banawa (third prize)

1999:
Can't Stop Loving You, composer: Dodjie Simon, interpreter: Lani Misalucha and The Noisy Neighbors (grand prize)
Tayo Pa Rin, composer: Soc Villanueva, interpreter: Zebedee Zuniga (second prize)
Clara's Eyes, composer: Joey Benin, interpreter: Side A (third prize)

2000:
Forever And A Day, composer: Angelo Villegas, interpreter: Rachel Alejandro (grand prize) 
Paano Na?, composer: Arnold Reyes, interpreter: Bituin Escalante (second prize) 
Ganyan Ako, composer: Vehnee Saturno, interpreter: Jeremiah (third prize)

2001
Pag-Uwi – composers:Louie Ocampo and Joey Ayala, interpreter- Martin Nievera (grand prize)
Kawikaan – composers:Laverne Ducut and Catherine Carlos, interpreter- Cynthia Alexander (second prize)
Heaven Sent - composer- Dennis Garcia, interpreter- Ella Mae Saison with The Saisons and Friends, musi arranger - Emil Mayor (third prize)

2003:
Malayo Man, Malapit Din - composer and interpreter- Bayang Barrios (grand prize)
Pretend That I Don't Love You – composer:Mike Villegas, interpreter- Cookie Chua (second prize)
Buti Na Lang – composer:Jonathan Manalo, interpreter- Kyla (third prize)

Metropop Star Search winners

1997:
Jonard Yanzon- "I Believe I Can Fly" (champion)
Carmela Cuneta- "Di Ko Na Kaya" (second place) 
Melanie Calumpad- "Somewhere Over the Rainbow" (third place)

1998:
Champagne Morales- "Journey to the Past" (champion)
Roxanne Barcelo- "Part of Your World" (second place)
Xaxa Manalo- "Bakit Pa?" (third place)

1999:
Miles Poblete - "Anak ng Pasig" (champion) 
Idelle Martinez- "Baby, One More Time" (second place)
Jericson Matias- "Stay the Same" (third place)

2000:
Anna Katrina Lara- "On the Wings of Love" (champion)
Camile Velasco - "How Could An Angel Break My Heart?"  (second place)
Jacky Garcia- "I Don't Wanna Miss A Thing" (third place)

See also
Himig Handog
Philippine Popular Music Festival

References

Music festivals established in 1977
Recurring events disestablished in 1985
Music festivals established in 1996
Recurring events disestablished in 2003
1977 establishments in the Philippines
1985 disestablishments in the Philippines
1996 establishments in the Philippines
2003 disestablishments in the Philippines
GMA Network original programming
Pop music festivals
Song contests
Music festivals in the Philippines
Festivals in Metro Manila
Philippine music awards